Jazz box or jazz square is a dance move seen in numerous dances of various styles, including line dance, novelty dances, jazz dance, disco, and hip hop. The name comes from its basic footwork: its four steps form a square pattern.

Basic footwork
Jazz square:
 Step forward on right
 Step across with the left
 Step to the side with the right
 Step to the side with the left 

Box step:
 Step left foot across the right foot
 Step right foot back behind the left foot
 Step left foot sideways parallel to the right foot
 Step right foot forward in front of the left foot
 Repeat all

In particular choreographies, the pattern may start from any step of the sequence and may also be mirrored, i.e., started from the right foot.

Variants of styling are endless, including various arm and body movements, Suzie Q action on steps 1, 2, skips and hops at some or all steps, etc.

See also
Box step, a similar footprint pattern, but without cross-steps

Social dance steps